The NASCAR Xfinity Series Championship Race is a NASCAR Xfinity Series event held at the Phoenix Raceway in Avondale, Arizona. Since 2020, it has been the season-finale for the series.

History

The race was first run in 1999 as the Outback Steakhouse 200. It became the Bashas' Supermarkets 200 in 2002. Following realignment of the two Xfinity Series races, the Arizona 200 took over the November slot.

The 2016 race was held at night and served as the sixth race of the NASCAR Xfinity Series playoffs.

Whelen Engineering Company served as the title sponsor of the race in 2018. Desert Diamond Casinos and Entertainment served as the title sponsor of the race in 2019 and 2020. When they did not return in 2021, NASCAR did not set out to find a replacement title sponsor and instead named the race the NASCAR Xfinity Series Championship Race (in previous years, many fans would refer to the last race of the season by that name anyway regardless of what the official name of the race was).

The race was a day race in 2020 and a night race in 2021.

In its three years as the last race of the Xfinity Series season, the driver who won the championship also won the race: Austin Cindric in 2020, Daniel Hemric in 2021 and Ty Gibbs in 2022.

Past winners

 2003: Race shortened due to rain.
 2004, 2006–2008, 2012, 2014, 2020, & 2021: Races extended due to a NASCAR overtime.

Multiple winners (drivers)

Multiple winners (teams)

Manufacturer wins

References

External links
 

1999 establishments in Arizona
NASCAR Xfinity Series races
 
Recurring sporting events established in 1999
Annual sporting events in the United States